Environmental Health is a peer-reviewed medical journal established in 2002 and published by BioMed Central. It covers research in all areas of environmental and occupational medicine. The editors-in-chief are Philippe Grandjean (University of Southern Denmark) and David Ozonoff (Boston University School of Public Health). According to the Journal Citation Reports, the journal has a 2019 impact factor of 4.690.

References

External links

BioMed Central academic journals
Publications established in 2002
Environmental health journals
English-language journals
Creative Commons Attribution-licensed journals